Paul Lacombe Hatfield (13 March 1873 – 28 January 1935) was a Liberal party member of the House of Commons of Canada. He was born in Arcadia, Nova Scotia and became a broker, insurance agent and master mariner. He also served as a warden and municipal councillor for Yarmouth, Nova Scotia.

The son of Abraham Hatfield and Margaret Short, he established himself in Yarmouth.

He was first elected to Parliament at the Yarmouth and Clare riding in the 1921 general election. After completing his first term in the House of Commons, riding boundaries were changed and Hatfield became a candidate in the new Shelburne—Yarmouth riding for the 1925 election where he won re-election. Hatfield was re-elected in 1926.

He was appointed to the Senate on 7 October 1926 and remained in that role until his death on 28 January 1935.

References

External links
 

1873 births
1935 deaths
Canadian senators from Nova Scotia
Liberal Party of Canada MPs
Liberal Party of Canada senators
People from Yarmouth, Nova Scotia
Members of the House of Commons of Canada from Nova Scotia
Nova Scotia municipal councillors